Lunasin is a peptide found in soy and some cereal grains, which has been the subject of research since 1996 focusing on cancer, cholesterol and cardiovascular disease and inflammation.

Discovery
Lunasin is a peptide that can be found in soy, barley, wheat, and rye. It is found both in grains originating in the American continents as well as the old world continents. This polypeptide was originally isolated, purified, and sequenced from soybean seed in 1987. Although uncertain about the peptide’s biological activity, the Japanese team of researchers described it as a 43-amino acid peptide, noting specifically the unusual poly (L-aspartic acid) sequence at the carboxyl terminus. Subsequent research by Alfredo Galvez in the laboratory of Ben de Lumen at the University of California–Berkeley identified the peptide as a subunit of the cotyledon-specific 2S albumin. The name of the protein was chosen from the Filipino word lunas, which means "cure".  Lunasin was patented as a biologic molecule in 1999 by de Lumen and Galvez.

Medical research
The biological activity of lunasin was discovered by Galvez while working in the laboratory of de Lumen at UC Berkeley.

There has been much research interest in the biomedical aspects of lunasin but the high cost of synthesizing lunasin made experimentation difficult. This limitation has been overcome by the development of methods to isolate highly purified lunasin from soybean white flake, a byproduct of soybean processing. In laboratory and animal experiments lunasin has shown anti-carcinogenic activity which suggests it may have chemopreventive potential.

ALS treatment
In 2014, a local news program reported that a person with ALS named Mike McDuff had experienced dramatic improvements in their speech, swallowing and limb strength while taking a supplement regimen containing lunasin. ALSUntangled investigated and was able to confirm that Mike McDuff had progressive muscular atrophy a 'lower motor neuron' form of ALS, and really did experience dramatic and objective improvements. Since one possible explanation for these improvements was the use of lunasin, Dr. Richard Bedlack of the Duke ALS Clinic decided to perform a clinical trial. Fifty people with ALS were put on the exact Lunasin containing regimen that Mike McDuff had taken and were followed for a year. The trial finished in September 2017. Unfortunately, there was no evidence that lunasin slowed, stopped or reversed ALS in any of the trial participants. Gastrointestinal side effects were more common than expected in trial participants, including cases of constipation severe enough to warrant hospitalization. Bedlack concluded that lunasin was not a useful treatment for ALS and that Mike McDuff likely had some other explanation for his ALS reversal such as an ALS mimic syndrome or a genetic resistance to the disease.

Impact on epigenetic changes
Lunasin was the first dietary compound with an identified epigenetic mechanism of action.  This mechanism (histone acetylation) was identified by Alfredo Galvez in 1996 and patented in 1999.

References

External links
Lunasin research repository
LunaMD Lunasin

Soy products
Peptides
Cancer research